Dissanayaka Mudiyanselage Dhamma Dissanayaka was the former Governor of the Sabaragamuwa Province in Sri Lanka.

References

Living people
Governors of Sabaragamuwa Province
Sinhalese politicians
Year of birth missing (living people)
Place of birth missing (living people)